Pejman Montazeri (born 6 September 1983) is an Iranian footballer; he plays for Al Kharaitiyat and former the Iranian national team.

Club career

Foolad
He was one of the exceptionally talented players in the Foolad squad that won the Iran Pro League in 2005, Montazeri played for Foolad in the 2006 AFC Champions League group stage.

Esteghlal
After Foolad was relegated to the Azadegan League, Montazeri signed with Esteghlal. He had been a regular player for the team in his first two seasons, where he won the Iran Pro League and the Hazfi Cup. He extended his contract with Esteghlal until 2013 where he won the league title in the 2012–13 season. He also reached the semi-final of the Asian Champions League with Esteghlal in 2013.

Umm Salal
Montazeri transferred to Umm Salal on 5 January 2014. When Montazeri joined Umm Salal, the club was in danger of relegation, but under the leadership of Montazeri, Umm Salal avoided relegation and finished 7th place.

Al Ahli
On 31 May 2015 Montazeri signed a two-year contract with Qatari club Al Ahli.

Return to Esteghlal
On 14 June, Montazeri Return to Esteghlal after a mutual decision not to renew his contract with Al Ahli. He was given the number 33 shirt, the same number he wore for Esteghlal during his first spell.

International career
Pejman Montazeri was a member of Iran U-23, participating in the 2006 Asian Games. On 5 October 2011, he made his debut for the senior side against Palestine which he managed to score as Iran beat their opponent 7–0. He was named Man of the match later. He was called to the national team for World Cup 2014 qualification, 2015 AFC Asian Cup qualification and 2012 WAFF Championship by coach Carlos Queiroz. On 1 June 2014, he was called into Iran's 2014 FIFA World Cup squad by Carlos Queiroz. He played full 90 minutes in all three matches for Team Melli, where Iran eliminated in the group stage. However, he missed 2015 AFC Asian Cup due to injury. He was also called up to play in the 2018 FIFA World Cup qualification and made a strong partnership with Morteza Pouraliganji and Jalal Hosseini as Iran qualified for the 2018 FIFA World Cup without conceding a single goal. In May 2018 he was named in Iran's preliminary squad for the 2018 FIFA World Cup in Russia.

Career statistics

Club

International
Statistics accurate as of match played 31 December 2018.

International goals
Scores and results list Iran's goal tally first.

Honours

Club
Foolad
Iran Pro League: 2004–05

Esteghlal
Iran Pro League: 2008–09, 2012–13
Hazfi Cup: 2007–08, 2011–12, 2017–18

Individual
Iran Football Federation Award player of the season: 2012–13 (Third)

References

External links

Pejman Montazeri at PersianLeague.com
Montazeri officially separates from Esteghlal

1983 births
Living people
Iran international footballers
Iranian footballers
Foolad FC players
Esteghlal F.C. players
Asian Games bronze medalists for Iran
People from Ahvaz
Umm Salal SC players
Al Ahli SC (Doha) players
Al Kharaitiyat SC players
Iranian expatriate footballers
Expatriate footballers in Qatar
Iranian expatriate sportspeople in Qatar
2014 FIFA World Cup players
Asian Games medalists in football
Footballers at the 2006 Asian Games
Medalists at the 2006 Asian Games
Persian Gulf Pro League players
Qatar Stars League players
Qatari Second Division players
2018 FIFA World Cup players
Association football defenders
2019 AFC Asian Cup players
Sportspeople from Khuzestan province